NHL 2005 is an ice hockey video game released in 2004, the successor to NHL 2004.

Features

Improvements/flaws
NHL 2005 features Open Ice Control, including moving players without the puck and also a complete World Cup mode where each team can be created from scratch. The user was now allowed to import digitized home arenas for the scratchbuilt teams (the 30 NHL arenas plus Nuremberg Arena, Kölnarena, Stockholm Globe Arena, Helsinki Hartwall Areena and Prague Sazka Arena were available). Additional NHL jerseys and logos were also available including those of the defunct Atlanta Flames, Winnipeg Jets, Colorado Rockies (NHL), Quebec Nordiques as well as the old style Los Angeles Kings, Washington Capitals and Vancouver Canucks uniforms of the 1970s and the 1980s.

The IIHF license which granted the World Cup mode also allowed EA to use real-life international jerseys for the only time (previously released games used unique jerseys designed by the game's staff which only bore a passing similarity to their real life counterparts, so the jersey shows their flag.) The PC version of the game was stripped down to the bare essentials, including the omitting of the create-a-player feature. These omissions were possibly due to the labour dispute that season, but EA explained that they had not perfected the new create-a-player interface, which would have allowed for far greater customizability than what was previously available.

Reception

The game received "generally favorable reviews" on all platforms except the PC version, which received "average" reviews, according to the review aggregation website Metacritic.

References

External links
 

2004 video games
Electronic Arts games
GameCube games
PlayStation 2 games
Xbox games
Windows games
Video games set in Canada
Video games set in the Czech Republic
Video games set in Finland
Video games set in Germany
Video games set in Sweden
NHL (video game series)
EA Sports games
Sports video games set in the United States
Video games set in 2004
Video games set in 2005
Video games developed in Canada